Hajjiabad-e Ghuri (also Romanized as Ḩājjīābād-e Ghūrī; also known as Ḩājīābād ‘Olyā, Ḩājjīābād, and Ḩājjīābād-e Bālā) is a village in Anarestan Rural District, Chenar Shahijan District, Kazerun County, Fars Province, Iran. At the 2006 census, its population was 1,248, in 280 families.

References 

Populated places in Chenar Shahijan County